The Pakistan national cricket team toured Australia in the 2004–05 season and played three Test matches against Australia. Australia won the series 3–0.

Tour matches

50 overs: Chairman's XI v Pakistanis

First-class: Western Australia v Pakistanis

50 overs: Australia A v Pakistanis

Twenty20: Australia A v Pakistanis

50 overs: Prime Minister's XI v Pakistanis

Test series

1st Test

2nd Test

3rd Test

VB Series 

During Pakistan's tour they competed in a triangular series with Australia and West Indies. Pakistan finished second in the round robin stage by winning three and losing three matches, but they lost 2–0 to Australia in the best-of-three final.

References 

 Playfair Cricket Annual
 Wisden Cricketers Almanack

External sources 
 ESPNCricinfo – Pakistan in Australia, 2004–2005
 CricketArchive

External links 
 Pakistan in Australia, 2004–2005

2004 in Pakistani cricket
2005 in Pakistani cricket
2004 in Australian cricket
2005 in Australian cricket
2004–05 Australian cricket season
2004-05
International cricket competitions in 2004–05